Rigga, stylized as RIGGA, is a group of artists and architects based in Portland, Oregon.

Works
 Alluvial Wall (2001)
 Echo Gate (2001)
 Ghost Ship (2001)
 Stack Stalk (2001)

See also

 Lovejoy Columns

References

External links
 Brief Statement, James M. Harrison Art & Design Studio

Architecture firms based in Oregon
Artists from Portland, Oregon